Gunnery Sergeant Peter Stewart (February 17, 1858 – June 17, 1914) was a member of the United States Marine Corps and a recipient of the Medal of Honor.

He was one a group of U.S. sailors and Marines dispatched to guard the United States legation in Beijing during the Boxer Rebellion, and was awarded the medal for his extreme gallantry in four separate actions during June 1900.

Stewart was buried at the Cypress Hills National Cemetery in Brooklyn, New York, Section 2, Grave 7303.

Medal of Honor citation
Rank and organization: Gunnery Sergeant, U.S. Marine Corps. Born: February 17, 1858, Airdrie, Scotland. Accredited to: Washington, D.C. G.O. No.: 55, July 19, 1901.

Citation:

In action with the relief expedition of the Allied forces in China during the battles of 13, 20, 21, and 22 June 1900. Throughout this period and in the presence of the enemy, Stewart distinguished himself by meritorious conduct.

See also
List of Medal of Honor recipients
List of Medal of Honor recipients for the Boxer Rebellion

References

United States Marine Corps Medal of Honor recipients
United States Marines
1858 births
1914 deaths
Burials at Cypress Hills National Cemetery
Scottish-born Medal of Honor recipients
Scottish emigrants to the United States
People from Washington, D.C.
American military personnel of the Boxer Rebellion
Boxer Rebellion recipients of the Medal of Honor
People from Airdrie, North Lanarkshire